Ildar Ildusovich Bikchantayev (born 2 February 1990) is a Russian former professional footballer.

Club career
He made his professional debut in the Russian Second Division in 2007 for FC Krylia Sovetov-SOK Dimitrovgrad.

He played for the main FC Rubin Kazan squad in the Russian Cup on 5 August 2008 in a game against FC Smena Komsomolsk-na-Amure and on 13 July 2010 in a game against FC Volgar Astrakhan.

External links

References

1990 births
Sportspeople from Ulyanovsk
Living people
Russian footballers
FC Rubin Kazan players
FC Gornyak Uchaly players
Association football midfielders
Association football forwards
FC Neftekhimik Nizhnekamsk players
FC Zenit-Izhevsk players
FC Volga Ulyanovsk players